Princess Sophie Marie Gabriele Pia of Liechtenstein (German: Sophie Marie Gabriele Pia, Prinzessin von und zu Liechtenstein) (11 July 1837, Vienna, Austrian Empire – 25 September 1899, Schloss Fischhorn, Zell am See, Salzburg, Austria-Hungary) was a Princess of Liechtenstein and member of the Princely House of Liechtenstein by birth. Through her marriage to Charles VI, Prince of Löwenstein-Wertheim-Rosenberg, Sophie was Princess of Löwenstein-Wertheim-Rosenberg from 4 May 1863 until 25 September 1899 and a member of the House of Löwenstein-Wertheim-Rosenberg.

Family

Sophie was the third eldest child and daughter of Aloys II, Prince of Liechtenstein and his wife Countess Franziska Kinsky of Wchinitz and Tettau. She was an elder sister of Johann II, Prince of Liechtenstein and Franz I, Prince of Liechtenstein.

Marriage and issue
Sophie married Charles, 6th Prince of Löwenstein-Wertheim-Rosenberg, only son and second and youngest child of Constantine, Hereditary Prince of Löwenstein-Wertheim-Rosenberg and his wife Princess Agnes of Hohenlohe-Langenburg, on 4 May 1863 in Vienna. Sophie and Charles had eight children:

 Princess Franziska of Löwenstein-Wertheim-Rosenberg (Kleinheubach 30 March 1864 - Düsseldorf 12 April 1930)
 Princess Adelheid of Löwenstein-Wertheim-Rosenberg (Kleinheubach 17 July 1865 - Prague 6 September 1941), married Count Adalbert Joseph of Schönborn
 Princess Agnes of Löwenstein-Wertheim-Rosenberg (Kleinheubach 22 December 1866 - Oosterhout 23 January 1954)
 Joseph, Hereditary Prince of Löwenstein-Wertheim-Rosenberg (Kleinheubach 11 April 1868 - Rome 15 February 1870)
 Princess Maria Theresa of Löwenstein-Wertheim-Rosenberg (Rome 4 January 1870 - Vienna 17 January 1935), married Miguel, Duke of Braganza
 Aloys, Prince of Löwenstein-Wertheim-Rosenberg (Kleinheubach 15 September 1871 - Schloss Bronnbach 25 January 1952), married Countess Josephine Kinsky of Wchinitz and Tettau
 Princess Anna of Löwenstein-Wertheim-Rosenberg (Kleinheubach 28 September 1873 - Vienna 27 June 1936), married Prince Felix of Schwarzenberg
 Prince Johannes Baptista of Löwenstein-Wertheim-Rosenberg (Kleinheubach 29 August 1880 - Newport 18 May 1956), married Countess Alexandra of Bernstorff

Ancestry

References

External links
Karl Fürst Zusammnen mit seiner zweiten Gemahlin Sophie, Prinzessin von und zu Liechtenstein.

1837 births
1899 deaths
Princesses of Löwenstein-Wertheim-Rosenberg
Liechtenstein princesses
Liechtenstein Roman Catholics
Nobility from Vienna
19th-century Liechtenstein women
Daughters of monarchs